Papyrus 43 (Gregory-Aland), signed by , is an early copy of the New Testament in Greek. It is a papyrus manuscript of the Book of Revelation, containing Rev 2:12-13, and 15:8-16:2. The manuscript has been paleographically dated to the 6th or 7th century CE.

Description 

W. E. Crum, and H. I. Bell describe  as "a small scrap of light-coloured papyrus... [written] in two, rough, inelegant sloping hands." Though the lines on each side are long, likely the papyrus only had extracts from Revelation on it, as it is hardly possible to have text from chapters 2 and 15 if the text was continuous. The text on the verso being the opposite way around to the text on the recto supports this conclusion.

The Greek text of this codex is a representative of the Alexandrian text-type. Aland placed it in Category II because of its date.

It is currently housed at the British Library (Inv. 2241) in London.

See also 

 List of New Testament papyri

References

Further reading 

 
 Ellwood M. Schofield, The Papyrus Fragments of the Greek New Testament, Southern Baptist Theological Seminary, Louisville, 1936, pp. 292–295.

New Testament papyri
6th-century biblical manuscripts
Book of Revelation papyri